The men's quadruple sculls competition at the 2018 Asian Games in Palembang, Indonesia was held from 20 August to 24 August at the JSC Lake.

Schedule 
All times are Western Indonesia Time (UTC+07:00)

Results

Heats 
 Qualification: 1 → Final A (FA), 2–4 → Repechage (R)

Heat 1

Heat 2

Repechage 

 Qualification: 1–4 → Final A (FA), 5–6 → Final B (FB)

Finals

Final B

Final A

References

External links 
Rowing at the 2018 Asian Games

Rowing at the 2018 Asian Games